Ground vibration boom is a phenomenon of very large increase in ground vibrations generated by high-speed railway trains travelling at speeds higher than the velocity of Rayleigh surface waves in the supporting ground.

Technical background 

This phenomenon, which is similar to a sonic boom from supersonic aircraft, was theoretically predicted in 1994. Its first experimental observation took place in 1997-1998 on the newly built high-speed railway line in Sweden (from Gothenburg to Malmo) for high-speed trains X 2000. At some locations along this line characterised by very soft ground (near Ledsgard) the Rayleigh wave velocity was as low as 45 m/s, and train speeds of only 165–170 km/h were sufficient to observe the effect. In particular, the increase in train speeds from 140 to 180 km/h was accompanied by about tenfold increase in generated ground vibration level, which agrees with the theory. It is now understood that, with the increase of operating train speeds, this phenomenon represents a major environmental problem associated with building new high-speed railway lines.

Mitigation measures 

The most efficient way to mitigate ground vibration boom is to reduce train speeds at locations where Rayleigh wave velocities in the ground are very low. If this is not desirable, e.g. for economic reasons, some mitigation measures can be applied, such as stiffening of railway embankments or building protective trenches and barriers between railways and residential or industrial buildings. Any mitigation measures would involve the specific ground investigation works along the route.

See also 

 High-speed trains
 Rayleigh waves
 Mach number
 Supershear earthquake

References

Further reading

External links 

 Railway Induced Vibration Abatement Solutions (RIVAS)
 Noise from the Railway - Network Rail

Mechanical vibrations
Waves
Seismology
Trains